Kristýna Badinková Nováková, née Nováková (born 24 April 1983) is a Czech film and television actress, born in Prague.

Filmography (film and television) 
 Honeymoon (2013)
 Ordinace v růžové zahradě (TV series, 2009) – Martina Tvrdíková
 Night Owls (2008) – Martina
 Taková normální rodinka (2008)
 Catch the Doctor! (2007) – Nurse Zuzanka Krízová
 Letiště (2006–2007) – Veronika Kliková
 The Ro©k Con Artists (2006) – Sárka
 Bazén (TV series, 2005)
 Rána z milosti (TV, 2005) – Marta
 Lovers & Murderers (2004)
 Seam Less (2003)
 Pátek čtrnáctého (TV, 2003)
 Nu, pogodi! (2000) – Hare
 Pelíšky (1999) – Jindřiška
 Kinetická encyklopedie vsehomíra (TV series, 1998)
 Bringing Up Girls in Bohemia (1997) – Agáta

References

External links 

 

Czech television actresses
1983 births
Actresses from Prague
Living people
Czech film actresses
20th-century Czech actresses
21st-century Czech actresses